Siba'i Ahmad Uthman (born 1938) is a Saudi journalist, author and short story writer. He was born in 1938 in the Sudan and studied at the College of Arts in Khartoum before commencing a career in journalism. Among Uthman's works are several volumes of short stories including Silence and the Walls and Circles in the Book of Time. His short story Silence and the Walls appeared in English translation in a 1988 anthology of Arabian literature edited by Salma Khadra Jayyusi.

References

Saudi Arabian writers
1938 births
Living people